Benin is a country of origin and transit for children subjected to trafficking in persons, specifically conditions of forced labor and forced prostitution. Until recently, analysts also considered Benin a destination country for foreign children brought to the country and subjected to forced labor, but new information from government and non-government sources indicates the total number of such children is not significant. The majority of victims are girls trafficked into domestic servitude or the commercial sex trade in Cotonou, the administrative capital. Some boys are forced to labor on farms, work in construction, produce handicrafts, or hawk items on the street. Many traffickers are relatives or acquaintances of their victims, exploiting the traditional system of vidomegon, in which parents allow their children to live with and work for richer relatives, usually in urban areas. There are reports that some tourists visiting Pendjari National Park in northern Benin exploit underage girls in prostitution, some of whom may be trafficking victims. Beninese children recruited for forced labor exploitation abroad are destined largely for Nigeria and Gabon, with some also going to Ivory Coast and other African countries, where they may be forced to work in mines, quarries, or the cocoa sector.

The Government of Benin does not fully comply with the minimum standards for the elimination of trafficking; however, it is making significant efforts to do so, despite limited resources. Over the last year, the government took steps to accelerate prosecution of trafficking offenders and increase the number of protective and preventive activities. In efforts to prevent human trafficking, it promulgated three decrees regulating the movement of children into and out of Benin and continued its countrywide effort to register births and issue birth certificates to all citizens. The government did not, however, collect and make available to its citizens and partners accurate law enforcement data on human trafficking issues. Further, it did not give its officials specialized training on how to recognize, investigate, and prosecute instances of trafficking.

U.S. State Department's Office to Monitor and Combat Trafficking in Persons placed the country in "Tier 2 Watchlist"  in 2017 and currently is in "Tier 2".

Prosecution
The government sustained its efforts to bring trafficking offenders to justice during the reporting period. Legislatively, Benin does not prohibit all forms of trafficking, though its 2006 Act Relating to the Transportation of Minors and the Suppression of Child Trafficking criminalizes all forms of child trafficking and prescribes penalties of up to 20 years’ imprisonment. These penalties are sufficiently stringent and exceed those prescribed for rape. The child trafficking law does not cover adults, though existing laws against kidnapping and labor exploitation give some protection to people more than 18 years old. The Ministry of Justice, Legislation and Human Rights reported that Benin’s eight courts handled a total of 200 cases of child trafficking and related offenses, including child abduction and corruption of children. At the close of the reporting period, 155 cases remained pending, five cases were dismissed, and 40 cases resulted in convictions; the government neither specified which of these cases involved child trafficking nor provided information on sentences given to convicted trafficking offenders. The Police Brigade for the Protection of Minors (BPM) handled 58 cases involving child trafficking or illegal movement of children out of the country without parental authorization, bringing 17 perpetrators to the Cotonou court for further investigation and prosecution. Gendarmes in the village of Porga arrested suspected traffickers trying to cross the Benin-Burkina Faso border en route to Ivory Coast with five children in April 2009, and delivered them to the court at Natitingou. The government did not provide information on the outcome of the Porga case, or data on cases handled by other branches of the police. There was no evidence of Beninese government officials’ complicity in trafficking offenses. Although the senior police members were provided training on child trafficking issues as part of their training at the police academy, other officials were not trained to recognize, investigate, and prosecute trafficking offenses.

Protection
Four government ministries and several international donors and NGOs effectively used their partnerships to widen Benin’s ability to assist, repatriate, and reintegrate victims of trafficking in 2009. The BPM reported rescuing 266 trafficking victims as they were being transported to and from Nigeria, Gabon, Ivory Coast, Mali, and Togo; these rescues were the product of partnerships with authorities of those countries. This figure represents an increase of 22 more rescues than in the previous year. Furthermore, working with UNICEF and Gabonese officials, the government repatriated 28 Beninese children, some of whom may have been trafficking victims, rescued from a boat carrying clandestine migrants off the coast of Gabon. In most cases, the BPM took initial custody of victims once inside Benin, and after an interview to confirm their status as trafficking victims, typically referred them to a network of long-term NGO shelters. The BPM holds recovered victims at a large government-built transit shelter it maintained in Cotonou, staffed by seven NGO personnel, until transferring victims to an NGO shelter for reintegration. During 2009, the BPM shelter took in 941 children, many of whom were trafficking victims, and offered them legal, medical, and psychological assistance. The Ministry of Family and National Solidarity worked with NGOs to reunite children with their families. No child goes back to its community of origin until there is a suitable point of reinsertion such as a school, vocational center, or apprenticeship. The government extended access for these children to the national network of social promotion centers, which provide basic social services in each of the country’s 77 communes. Foreign victims of trafficking offenses received assistance from the government through the BPM and social promotion centers before repatriation. According to an NGO leading the repatriation and shelter of Beninese victims from the Abeokuta quarries in Nigeria, the Beninese Ministry of Family, the BPM, and the Beninese Consulate in Nigeria repatriated 20 trafficking victims between August and December 2009. Both BPM and the office of Family and Child Monitoring at the Ministry of Family established operational databases on child trafficking during the year, but neither yielded data on trafficking victims during the reporting period. Officials encouraged victims to assist in the investigation of trafficking offenders, but shielded children from taking part in the trial unless a judge required it. Victims were not inappropriately incarcerated or fined for unlawful acts committed as a direct result of being trafficked, but the government did not have a mechanism for screening victims of trafficking among populations of women and children in prostitution.

Prevention
Through partnerships with local and international agencies, the government provided partial support for several new programs to prevent child trafficking. In 2009, the Ministry of Family, with foreign donor support, established 142 new local committees to enable community surveillance in Benin and along the Benin-Nigeria border. The BPM, immigration agents, and gendarmes took up stations at international border crossings to screen travelers and monitor the transport of children. These observers relied on community whistleblowers to alert them to suspicious cases. Furthermore, the government completed ahead of schedule its 2008-2012 National Plan to Combat Child Trafficking and Labor. Also in 2009, the government joined with foreign partners to implement a second anti-child trafficking project to improve living conditions and advance respect for children’s rights, thus addressing key structural causes of Benin’s trafficking problem. The government, in partnership with UNICEF and a major regional bank, launched a seven-day awareness campaign against child sex tourism. The government provided training to Beninese troops on issues of child trafficking and exploitation prior to their deployment abroad for international peacekeeping missions.

See also
Crime in Benin
Human rights in Benin

References

Benin
Benin
Human rights in Benin
Crime in Benin
Women's rights in Benin